Two ships of the United States Navy have borne the name USS Pickerel, named for the pickerel, a young or small pike.

 The first, was a Porpoise-class submarine, launched in 1936 and lost in 1943 under unknown circumstances.

A third ship, was originally laid down as USS Pickerel, but renamed prior to her 1912 launch.

United States Navy ship names